Siu Chun Ming (born 27 December 1995) is a former Hong Kong professional footballer who played as an attacking midfielder.

Club career
In the 2014–15 season, Siu scored 9 goals.

In 2015, Siu joined Dreams Metro Gallery.

On 12 July 2016, Siu was introduced as a Pegasus player during the club's season opening training session.

References

External links
 Siu Chun Ming at HKFA
 

1995 births
Living people
Hong Kong footballers
Association football wingers
Hong Kong Premier League players
Hong Kong First Division League players
Sham Shui Po SA players
South China AA players
Metro Gallery FC players
TSW Pegasus FC players